The Madness is the only studio album by the British ska/pop band The Madness, a short-lived incarnation of Madness. It was originally released in mid-1988, on the label Virgin. The album was produced by the Three Eyes, a pseudonym, whose identities remain a mystery (although they may very well be Madness themselves, or individual members of Madness). With the demise of Madness and the group's own label Zarjazz, the Madness were directly recruited under Virgin Records.

When the album was released in late April 1988, it received dismissive reviews and peaked at No. 66 in the UK, lasting within the Top 100 for only one week. Two singles, "I Pronounce You" and "What's That", were released from the album, although like the album these were less successful than the original band releases. "I Pronounce You" was the lead single, released in the UK and Portugal. Receiving lukewarm reception from the music press, it peaked at No. 44 in the UK, lasting on the charts for four weeks after originally debuting at No. 48. "What's That", the album's second and final single, was released in the UK only. It was the first release by Madness or any of its spin-off bands not to reach the Top 75 in the UK. It peaked at No. 92 and lasted two weeks on the chart, dropping to No. 98 the following week after its debut.

Background

After Madness' 1985 album Mad Not Mad, the band attempted to record a new album, and eleven demo tracks were recorded. However, musical differences arose between band members, and in September 1986, the band announced that they were to split. Following the breakup of the original Madness, four of the original members (lead vocalist Suggs, saxophonist Lee Thompson, guitarist Chris Foreman and vocalist Cathal Smyth) recreated the band, adding "The" to its name. When originally trying to find a new name for the group, such titles as the Wasp Factory, the One, More and the Earthmen were considered, and at one point BBC Radio 1 listeners were even invited to write in with suggestions. Eventually, the band settled on the title of The Madness.

Since the new band did not include a bassist or drummer, guest musicians (mostly Bruce Thomas) played bass, while a drum machine was used in place of a live drummer on most tracks. UB40's Earl Falconer contributed bass to three tracks, and then Bruce Thomas (bass) and Steve Nieve (keyboards) from Elvis Costello's the Attractions were recruited. On "What's That" Simon Philips added some brushes to help capture a jazzy feel. Ex-Special Jerry Dammers re-appeared to add keyboards to a couple of numbers and the ska connection was further strengthened by ska band the Potato 5 who supplied the horn section. The band recorded their only album The Madness at Liquidator Studios, whilst it was mixed at the Townhouse studios in London. Liquidator Studios had been the band's own studio since circa 1985, located on Caledonian Road in North London, in what was once the premises of their fan club office. They built the 24-track professional studio in the basement, whilst the first floor has always been an office and chill out area, and a room upstairs for song mixing. Unlike any previous Madness album, the lead vocals on The Madness were almost evenly shared between Suggs and Smyth. Suggs performed lead vocals for "In Wonder", "Nightmare Nightmare", "Thunder & Lightning", "Beat the Bride", "11th Hour", "Be Good Boy" and "4.B.F." Smyth sang on "Nail Down the Days", "What's That", "Song in Red", "Gabriel's Horn" and "Flashings". Both Smyth and Suggs performed lead vocals on "I Pronounce You" and "Oh". The production was credited to "the Three Eyes".

Some of the songs that appeared on the album were re-recorded from the demos of the 1986 Madness sessions. In "I Pronounce You" the lyrics concern a bride's feelings on the eve of her arranged marriage. To add a middle eastern feel to the song, Foreman played sitar on the song, an instrument he'd used on previous Madness albums.  This was in addition to usual guitar, whilst the track also features tabla. The track "Song in Red" was reportedly written by Smyth about a cousin who died young. "Gabriel's Horn" was recorded in 1986 when the group were working on the never-completed Lost in the Museum album, and this demo version appeared as a track on the 1992 re-issue of the Madness single "House of Fun".

The band initially stressed that they were not "the Nutty Boys" the public knew and loved, as they attempted to become a more serious group. The band were pleased with the album upon completion as it took a long time to complete and for the first time in their career they worked without the Clive Langer/Alan Winstanley production team, choosing instead to produce it themselves. The band saw their debut album as only the start of a new beginning, with the members being very optimistic about the future. However, due to the lack of commercial success from the album and singles, the Madness disbanded by the beginning of 1989. Virgin Record's lack of faith in the band was confirmed when they opted not to renew their contract. The demise of the Madness left the members of the band in a state of confusion, not knowing quite what they were going to do next. Madness reformed with its original members for a reunion tour in 1992 and they have remained together since, playing live and recording new material.

In an October 1988 interview for Guitarist & Scootering with Foreman and the band, Foreman described the new album as "brilliant". Foreman added "Some of it is very recognizably us and some of it isn't. Carl has doing a lot of singing. He's been doing a lot of writing as well, he's written well over half the album as well, which is good because he's always got loads of ideas for songs and it's good to get them out of him. When we were doing the album, Suggs and myself programmed all the drum machines. But it's sort of done me out of a job really, because I used to write the tunes and they'd write the lyrics, but now they're writing their own tunes and their own lyrics, so I'm redundant." Speaking of trying to become a more serious band, Foreman used the "I Pronounce You" video as an example, stating "We are what we are really. On the one video we've just done we tried to be serious, but Lee's got a Mohican haircut and in a bit of it we dyed his face red and things like that, so it hard to be... we don't want to be a serious, cheeks sucked-in arty farty band, but the subject matter of a lot of our songs has always been serious."

Cover artwork
The album's sleeve was designed by Dave Gibbons and Rian Hughes. On the back-sleeve each song listed was accompanied with a small drawing in similar style to the album's cover – resembling a face. Both "I Pronounce You" and "What's That" featured their own drawing as the main sleeve design when they were issued as singles. The album was respectfully dedicated to the memory of Roy Davies (1940–1987), who played keyboards on the Mad Not Mad album as well as The Madness, on the song "I Pronounce You".

Release
The album was originally issued on CD and vinyl LP via Virgin Records in the UK and Europe, including France, Germany, Italy and Spain. On 21 July 1988 a CD edition was also issued in Japan. Since its initial release, the album has remained out-of-print on CD and today second-hand copies are often listed for sale for £50 or more.

The vinyl version of the album featured ten tracks, however the CD edition added four other tracks; "11th Hour," "Be Good Boy," "Flashings" and "4.B.F." However, there was one remaining track released by the group that did not appear on the CD edition; an instrumental track titled "Patience". This was the B-Side to the "I Pronounce You" single. A vocal version of the song later appeared on the unofficial Madness release The Lost Album. Also included on The Lost Album were demo versions of "What's That" and "Beat the Bride".

Beginning in 2009, Madness albums were remastered and expanded via Union Square Music and Salvo. All of the band's original albums were released in this series by Union Square Music/Salvo, except for the Mad Not Mad album which was released by Virgin Records as a remastered and expanded edition in 2010. Each Union Square Music/Salvo release contained a page of Madness albums soon to be made available as part of the series. The Madness was listed as one of these upcoming releases, however as of 2017 this remains the only Madness album not to receive such a release. In late 2012, as part of the Ask Chris Foreman (Chrissy Boy) section on Madness' official website, one fan asked about the remastered version of the album and if it was due for release as promised. Foreman responded "I am not sure if we own the rights to that album."

Promotion
Upon release, the "I Pronounce You" single had a music video created to promote it. It later appeared as part of the 1992 VHS compilation Divine Madness, which was later issued on DVD in 2002 and as a CD+DVD set in 2005. "What's That" had no video, as Virgin Records chose not to commission one.

In promoting to the album and lead single, the one and only TV appearance of the Madness was on Friday Night Live, a cult late-night comedy show hosted by Ben Elton. On the show the band performed "I Pronounce You" and the album track "Beat the Bride". On the show, John Hasler, the ex-Madness drummer and manager, helped out on drums. He also appeared on the drums in the "I Pronounce You" music video.

Critical reception

Upon release, Graeme Kay of Smash Hits described the album as "something of a hit and miss affair". He highlighted the tracks "Nail Down the Days", "What's That" and "Beat the Bride", but felt "the rest of the LP tries too hard to be clever". He concluded: "Not a great LP by any means, but not bad". Max Bell of Number One wrote: "Songwise, the Camden crooners continue to delve into sombre waters. The [new] Madness [music] is still reminiscent of a nightmare in a funfair on occasions but it's that very stylised sound which makes the Mad ones matter."

Darryl Cater of AllMusic retrospectively stated: "The tinny, muddled pop sound proves what a big contribution producers Clive Langer and Alan Winstanley had made to the polished, resonant Madness records. There are flashes of trademark Madness melody, but too much of the album is an indistinguishable blur of drum machines, keyboards and '80s pop guitar. Exceptions include the reggae-flavoured "Beat the Bride" and the sitar-savvy single "I Pronounce You." These former British skinheads have always been better at the wacky than the meaningful, and the lyrical emphasis on social issues feels strained."

Track listing

Chart performance

Personnel
Credits are adapted from the album's liner notes.
The Madness
Graham "Suggs" McPherson – lead vocals (3-5, 7-9, 11, 12, 14), backing vocals (1, 2, 7, 13), piano (9, 13), timbales (9), bongos (14)
Cathal Smyth – lead vocals on (1-4, 6, 10, 13), backing vocals (7, 9, 11, 14), acoustic guitar (3), keyboards (1)
Chris Foreman – guitar (1-12, 14), sitar (3), synthaxe (5), piano solo (9), synthesizer effects (14)
Lee Thompson – saxophones (1, 4-12, 14), flute (3), backing vocals (3)
Additional musicians
Steve Nieve – keyboards (1, 2, 4, 5, 12, 14), piano (6, 8)
Roy Davies – keyboards (3) 
Ian Prince – Hammond organ (7), piano solo (7), piano (10), synthesizer (10)
Jerry Dammers – piano (7), electronic organ (7), Hammond organ (9), hi hat (9)
Seamus Beaghen – accordion (4), keyboards (8, 11), Hammond organ (6, 8)
Bruce Thomas – bass guitar (1, 2, 4-6, 8, 13)
Earl Falconer – bass guitar (7, 9, 10)
Big George Webley – bass guitar (12, 14)
Scotty – bass guitar (3)
Simon Phillips – drums (2, 6)
Esmail Sheikh – tablas (3)
Dick Cuthell – horns (7, 9, 10), cowbell (9)
Rick Walker – tenor saxophone (1, 2, 13)
Andy Minnion – baritone saxophone (1, 2, 13)
Malcolm Buck – tenor saxophone (1, 2, 13)
Simon Driscoll – trombone (1, 2, 13)
Lorenzo Hall – backing vocals (8, 11, 12)
Anthony Lee Brian – backing vocals (8, 11, 12)
Robbie Ellington – backing vocals (8, 11, 12)
Technical
The Three Eyes – production
Steve Chase – co-production; engineer, mixing
Nick Froome – engineer
Hugh Padgham – mixing
Michael H. Brauer – mixing
Dave Gibbons – sleeve
Rian Hughes – sleeve

References

External links

1988 debut albums
Madness (band) albums
Virgin Records albums